Dejan Branković (born August 29, 1980 in Niš) is a Serbian footballer last playing for JJK.

References
  at Srbijafudbal

1980 births
Living people
Serbian footballers
Serbian expatriate footballers
FK Vardar players
Expatriate footballers in North Macedonia
OFK Beograd players
Serbian SuperLiga players
FC Baku players
JJK Jyväskylä players
Macedonian First Football League players
Azerbaijan Premier League players
Veikkausliiga players
Expatriate footballers in Azerbaijan
Expatriate footballers in Finland
Association football defenders
Serbian expatriate sportspeople in Azerbaijan